

Economics
 Redistribution (cultural anthropology) in relation to non-market economic exchange
 Redistribution of income and wealth
 Redistributive change, theory of economic justice in U.S. law

Government and politics
 Redistribution (Australia), the legal process in Australia whereby electoral boundaries are moved
 Redistribution (election), the changing of political borders
 Redistricting, the redistribution of political borders in the United States

Science and computing
 Redistribution (chemistry), a chemical reaction involving ligand exchange
 Freely redistributable software
 Route redistribution transfers routes between routing protocols